Heygeh-e Kaliab (also Romanized as Heygeh-e Kālīāb; also known as Hegeh-e Kālīāb-e Yek and Heygeh-e Ebrāhīm) is a village in Mamulan Rural District, Mamulan District, Pol-e Dokhtar County, Lorestan Province, Iran. At the 2006 census, its population was 60, in 14 families.

References 

Towns and villages in Pol-e Dokhtar County